Aïn Tesra is a town and commune in Bordj Bou Arréridj Province, Algeria. At the time of the 2008 census, it had a population of 9,570.

References

Communes of Bordj Bou Arréridj Province